Taika Koilahti (born 4 December 1998) is a Finnish athlete. She competed in the women's long jump event at the 2019 World Athletics Championships.

References

External links

1998 births
Living people
Finnish female long jumpers
Place of birth missing (living people)
World Athletics Championships athletes for Finland
Finnish Athletics Championships winners